This is a list of Hanoverian princes from the accession of George III to the throne of the Kingdom of Hanover in 1814. Individuals holding the title of prince will usually also be styled "His Royal Highness"  (HRH). The wife of a Hanoverian prince will usually take the title and style of her husband. Despite Hanover's annexation by Prussia in 1866, male-line descendants of George III continue to style themselves as a prince or princess of Hanover.

The title Prince of Hanover and the use of the style "Royal Highness" has generally been restricted to the following persons:
the legitimate sons of a Hanoverian Sovereign,
the legitimate male line descendants of a Hanoverian Sovereign

Since 1953, the head of the House of Hanover and senior male-line descendant of George III of the United Kingdom has taken the title His Royal Highness The Prince of Hanover. This title has been held by the following:
Prince Ernest Augustus of Hanover (1914–1987)
Prince Ernest Augustus of Hanover (born 1954)

List of Hanoverian princes since 1814

Crown Prince of Hanover